The 1960–61 Challenge Cup was the 60th staging of rugby league's oldest knockout competition, the Challenge Cup.

The final was contested by St Helens and Wigan at Wembley Stadium in London.

The final was played on Saturday 13 May 1961, where St Helens beat Wigan 12–6 in front of a crowd of 94,672.

The Lance Todd Trophy was awarded to St Helens  Dick Huddart.

First round

Second round

Quarterfinals

Semifinals

Final

References

External links
Challenge Cup official website 
Challenge Cup 1960/61 results at Rugby League Project

Challenge Cup
Challenge Cup